Silverwater is a suburb of the City of Lake Macquarie in New South Wales, Australia, and is located on a peninsula east of the town of Morisset on the western side of Lake Macquarie. The Aboriginal people, in this area, the Awabakal, were the first people of this land.

References

External links
 History of Silverwater (Lake Macquarie City Library)

Suburbs of Lake Macquarie